Ben Jones (born 18 October 1988) is an English former professional rugby league footballer.

Background
Jones was born in Beeston, Leeds, West Yorkshire, England.

Career
He previously played for Harlequins RL and went out on loan to London Skolars and Doncaster in 2010. 

Jones played junior rugby league for his local amateur club Hunslet Parkside and previously played in the youth teams at Castleford and Leeds.

References

External links
Harlequins Rugby League profile

1988 births
Living people
Dewsbury Rams players
Doncaster R.L.F.C. players
English rugby league players
London Broncos players
London Skolars players
People from Beeston, Leeds
Rugby league players from Leeds
Rugby league props
Sheffield Eagles
York City Knights players